Christian Tamminga (born 30 April 1974 in Leiden) is a retired Dutch athlete who specialised in the pole vault. His biggest success was the sixth place at the 2001 World Championships.

His personal bests in the event are 5.76 metres outdoors (1998) and 5.60 metres indoors (2002).

After retiring, he started a company manufacturing athletics equipment.

Competition record

1No mark in the final

References

1974 births
Living people
Dutch male pole vaulters
Sportspeople from Leiden
Competitors at the 2001 Goodwill Games
20th-century Dutch people
21st-century Dutch people